Psocetae is an infraorder of bark lice in the order Psocodea (formerly Psocoptera), within the suborder Psocomorpha. It includes the families Hemipsocidae, Myopsocidae, Psilopsocidae and Psocidae.

References

 Lienhard, C. & Smithers, C. N. 2002. Psocoptera (Insecta): World Catalogue and Bibliography. Instrumenta Biodiversitatis, vol. 5. Muséum d'histoire naturelle, Genève.

 
Insect infraorders